Dictyotenguna is a genus of planthoppers native to Guangxi, China.

References 

Insects of China
Insects described in 2012
Dictyopharinae
Hemiptera genera